Fallon is a city in Churchill County in the U.S. state of Nevada. The population was 9,327 at time of the 2020 census. Fallon is the county seat of Churchill County and is located in the Lahontan Valley.

History
The community was first populated during the California Gold Rush, because multiple would-be Forty-niners stopped after crossing the Carson River.

The town and post office were established on July 24, 1896, in a little shack belonging to Michael Fallon and Eliza Fallon, who operated a ranch at the site. Shortly afterwards, Jim Richards later operated a store near the post office.

The town was officially incorporated in 1908.

Lincoln Highway, the first transcontinental thoroughfare, passes through Fallon from east to west, following the original Pony Express trail.  Today it is designated U.S. Highway 50, and eastward from Fallon is popularly known as The Loneliest Road in America, as it passes through only two towns and one small city between Fallon and the Utah state line, over 400 miles distant. 

When U.S. Highway 95 (stretching between the U.S. borders with Canada and Mexico) was laid out in the 1930s, the highway north of town met Highway 50 at the northern end of what was then the town center (Maine Street).  To avoid forcing traffic through town, there is a four-block "dogleg" on Highway 50 separating the north and south legs of Highway 95. 

While the city has expanded greatly over the years, the "old town" area is several blocks of Maine Street. Many of the buildings here date back to the early 20th century, including the historic Fallon Theater, which is still in operation as of 2023.

Naval Air Station Fallon, built in 1942, is southeast of the city center. Since 1996, NAS Fallon has been home to the U.S. Navy's Navy Fighter Weapons School (popularly known as TOPGUN), using several flight training areas and practice ranges in the area. 

On June 16, 2019, downtown (Maine Street) Fallon was listed in the National Register of Historic Places.

Geography
Fallon is located in western Churchill County at the geographic coordinates  (39.472792, −118.778826). It is in the Lahontan Valley, a former lakebed into which flows the Carson River, which passes north of the city.

Demographics
As of the census of 2000, there were 7,536 people, 3,004 households, and 1,877 families residing in the city. The population density was 2,474.1 people per square mile (954.0/km2). There were 3,336 housing units at an average density of 1,095.2 per square mile (422.3/km2). The racial makeup of the city was 76.5% White, 2.0% African American, 3.0% Native American, 4.7% Asian, 0.3% Pacific Islander, 0.3% from other races, and 3.3% from two or more races. Hispanic or Latino of any race were 9.9% of the population.

There were 3,004 households, out of which 35.4% had children under the age of 18 living with them, 42.7% were married couples living together, 15.3% had a female householder with no husband present, and 37.5% were non-families. 30.7% of all households were made up of individuals, and 11.4% had someone living alone who was 65 years of age or older. The average household size was 2.45 and the average family size was 3.06.

In the city, the population was spread out, with 28.4% under the age of 18, 10.3% from 18 to 24, 29.7% from 25 to 44, 19.4% from 45 to 64, and 12.2% who were 65 years of age or older. The median age was 32 years. For every 100 females, there were 95.7 males. For every 100 females age 18 and over, there were 91.5 males.

The median income for a household in the city was $35,935, and the median income for a family was $41,433. Males had a median income of $35,356 versus $22,818 for females. The per capita income for the city was $16,919. About 9.5% of families and 12.6% of the population were below the poverty line, including 15.6% of those under age 18 and 10.3% of those age 65 or over.

Between 1997 and 2003, the Fallon community experienced an unusually high incidence of childhood leukemia. In response, the U.S. Senate held the Field Hearing Before the Committee on Environment and Public Works during the winter of 2001. Nevada Assemblywoman Merle A. Berman was a participant. According to the minutes of that hearing, on February 14, Berman pressed for answers to ascertain why certain individuals, but not others were selected for the panel of experts chosen to investigate the leukemia clusters and "why the Federal Government was not involved in the testing." And on April 12, Berman obtained this testimony from one of the medical experts in attendance:

“[Dr. Thomas Sinks, the associate director for science at the National Center for Environmental Health at the Centers for Disease Control] clarified that nobody ever developed cancer because of chances. There was always a cause, and the challenge in Fallon would be to discover the common denominator among the 11 children. The unifying cause was not yet known, but eventually science would identify the commonality. The probability of the Fallon cluster being a chance event was described by Dr. Sinks as being unlikely."

In 2011, epidemiologists at the University of California, Berkeley theorized that the "space-time patterning" of the leukemia cluster was "consistent with the involvement of an infectious disease," and that a "possible mode of transmission" was "by means of a vector" since mosquitoes were "abundant in Churchill County outside of the urban area of Fallon."

Education
The city is served by the Churchill County School District. Churchill County High School is the main high school and also caters to students in rural areas outside the city. Western Nevada College has a campus in Fallon.

Fallon has a public library, the Churchill County Library.

Climate 
Fallon experiences a cold desert climate, with hot summers and cold winters. Due to Fallon's elevation and aridity, the diurnal temperature variation is quite substantial, especially in the summer months. Fallon's climate is quite dry, due to its location in the Rain Shadow of the Sierra Nevada. Summer days can be hot, but temperatures are cooler than in deserts such as the Mojave, Sonoran, and Chihuahuan deserts, due to Fallon's altitude and higher latitude north of the equator. In the winter, daytime temperatures are usually above freezing, but nights can be bitterly cold. Fallon can experience heavy fog in winter, known as pogonip.

Nuclear weapons testing
Named Project Shoal, the 12.5-kiloton detonation was part of the Vela Uniform program. The site is located in Gote Flat in the Sand Springs Range.

Access to the Project Shoal Area is unrestricted. Access to the area is by Highway 50, Nevada Highway 839, then to an improved gravel road to the site.

In popular culture
 The Wizard, starring Fred Savage and Beau Bridges, was shot in and around Fallon.
 The Go-Getter, starring Zooey Deschanel and Jena Malone, mentions Fallon many times and even brings up Fallon's annual Heart 'O Gold Cantaloupe Festival. Malone's character lives in Fallon, and parts of the movie were filmed in and around Fallon.

Notable people
 John C. Carpenter, rancher, businessman, and politician, was born in Fallon.
 Harvey Dahl, St. Louis Rams a former offensive lineman, was born in Fallon.
 Wuzzie George, Northern Paiute craftswoman and recorder of indigenous lifeways
 Luella Kirkbride Drumm, former member of the Nevada Assembly
 Martin Heinrich, U.S. Senator from New Mexico since 2013; was considered for nominee Hillary Clinton's running mate for the 2016 presidential election, born in Fallon but raised in Columbia, Missouri.
 Meaghan Martin, actress.
 Joshua Mauga, a Fallon native, played for the Kansas City Chiefs.

Twin towns
Fallon is twinned with the following towns:
 Georgia Vani, Georgia

See also

 Fallon Municipal Airport
 Salmon Creek Railroad
 Spirit Cave mummy
 Federal Building and Post Office (Fallon, Nevada)

Notes

References
 Steinmaus, C., M. Lu, R.L. Todd, A.H. Smith. Probability estimates for the unique childhood leukemia cluster in Fallon, Nevada, and risks near other U.S. military aviation facilities. Environmental Health Perspectives. 112(6): 766–771. May 2004.

External links

 City of Fallon official website
 Fallon Chamber of Commerce
 Fallon business
 Grimes Point Trail  (Bureau of Land Management), with pictures of the carvings

 
1896 establishments in Nevada
Cities in Churchill County, Nevada
County seats in Nevada
Micropolitan areas of Nevada
Nevada State Register of Historic Places
Populated places established in 1896
Cities in Nevada